Krasnoselsko-Kalininskaya line, or simply line 6, is a passenger rapid transit line of the Saint Petersburg Metro system currently under construction. It is identified by the livery colour of brown. Train service is expected to begin in 2024 with 2 stations initially, and 4 more stations inaugurated later in 2026 or 2027. The line lies from Krasnoselsky District, then travels northeastward, with interchange stations allowing passenger transfer with line 1, line 2 and line 5.

In the longer term of planning, the northeast end of line 6 would continue extending into Kalininsky District.

References
 
 

Saint Petersburg Metro lines